Commemorative banknotes are issued to mark some particular event. Such notes include:

Africa
Commemorative banknotes of the Gambian dalasi
Commemorative banknotes of the Zambian kwacha

North, Central and South America
Commemorative banknotes of the Brazilian real
Commemorative banknotes of the Canadian dollar
Commemorative banknotes of Costa Rica
Commemorative banknotes of the Guyanese dollar

Asia
Commemorative banknotes of the Bangladeshi taka
Commemorative banknotes of the Bhutanese ngultrum
Commemorative banknotes of the Brunei dollar
Commemorative banknotes of the Chinese renminbi
Commemorative banknotes of the Hong Kong dollar
Commemorative banknotes of the Indonesian rupiah
Commemorative banknotes of the Kazakhstani tenge
Commemorative banknotes of the Kyrgyzstani som
Commemorative banknotes of the Macanese pataca
Commemorative banknotes of the Malaysian ringgit
Commemorative banknotes of the Philippine peso
Commemorative banknotes of the Singapore dollar
Commemorative banknotes of the Sri Lankan rupee
Commemorative banknotes of the Thai baht

Europe
Commemorative banknotes of the Czech koruna
Commemorative banknotes of the Romanian leu
Commemorative banknotes of the Russian ruble
Commemorative banknotes of the Transnistrian ruble
Commemorative banknotes of the Ukrainian hryvnia

Oceania
Commemorative banknotes of the Fijian dollar
Commemorative banknotes of the New Zealand dollar

See also
Commemorative coin
List of buildings and structures illustrated on banknotes
List of motifs on banknotes

Commemorative banknotes